Eric H. Cline (born September 1, 1960) is an author, historian, archaeologist, and professor of ancient history and archaeology at The George Washington University (GWU) in Washington, D.C., where he is Professor of Classics and Anthropology and the former Chair of the Department of Classical and Near Eastern Languages and Civilizations, as well as Director of the GWU Capitol Archaeological Institute. He is also the advisor for the undergraduate archaeology majors, for which he was awarded the GWU Award for "Excellence in Undergraduate Departmental Advising" (2006). Cline served as co-editor of the Bulletin of the American Schools of Oriental Research along with Christopher Rollston from 2014-2020.

Background
Cline received his B.A. in Classical Archaeology at Dartmouth College in 1982 and his M.A. in Near Eastern Languages and Literatures at Yale University in 1984.

He was awarded a Fulbright scholarship (Greece) in 1989 and in 1991 received his Ph.D. in Ancient History from the University of Pennsylvania.

He has served as a Trustee and Board Member (in addition to holding various other offices) for both the Archaeological Institute of America and the American Schools of Oriental Research.

Field work

Cline is an active field archaeologist with more than 30 seasons of excavation and survey experience in Israel, Egypt, Jordan, Cyprus, Greece, Crete, and the United States, including ten seasons at the site of Megiddo (biblical Armageddon) in Israel, from which he has retired after serving as Co-Director with Israel Finkelstein of Tel Aviv University. He is currently Co-Director, with Assaf Yasur-Landau of the University of Haifa, of the renewed excavations at Tel Kabri, Israel, which have been conducted since 2005. Recent discoveries by Cline and his team include the Near East's oldest wine cellar.

Selected awards and recognition
Considered for a Pulitzer Prize (2014), Cline has won awards for his books six times—he is a two-time winner of the American Schools of Oriental Research "Nancy Lapp Popular Book Award" (2014 and 2018) and a three-time winner of the Biblical Archaeology Society's "Best Popular Book on Archaeology" Award (2001, 2009, and 2011); in addition, a volume that he co-edited won the 2019 G. Ernest Wright Award from the American Schools of Oriental Research. He has also won both national and local teaching awards, including the national "Excellence in Undergraduate Teaching" Award from the Archaeological Institute of America (2005) and the GWU "Morton Bender Excellence in Undergraduate Teaching" Award (2004). In addition, he has received the two highest awards given at GWU: one for teaching, the "Oscar and Shoshana Trachtenberg Award for Teaching Excellence" (2012), and the other for scholarly research, the "Oscar and Shoshana Trachtenberg Award for Faculty Scholarship" (2011). He is the first faculty member in GWU history to have won both awards. He has been nominated three times for the CASE US Professor of the Year (2008, 2009, and 2012). In May 2015, he was awarded an honorary doctorate from Muhlenberg College. In July 2015, he was named a member of the inaugural class of NEH Public Scholars, receiving the award for his book project entitled Digging Up Armageddon: The Search for the Lost City of Solomon, which was published by Princeton University Press in March 2020. In Fall 2018, Cline was initiated into the world's first Archaeology Fraternity, Delta Iota Gamma ("DIG"). Cline was named a Getty Scholar for the 2020-21 academic year, but postponed until 2021-22.

Selected publications (books)
Cline is the author or editor of 20 books. Many have been translated, into a total of 19 languages, including French, German, Italian, Dutch, Spanish, Portuguese, Greek, Arabic, Turkish, Korean, Chinese (both Simplified and Traditional), Japanese, Russian, Czech, Serbian, Bulgarian, Polish, and Hungarian. They include:
 Sailing the Wine-Dark Sea: International Trade and the Late Bronze Age Aegean (1994; reprinted 2009), 
 The Aegean and the Orient in the Second Millennium. Proceedings of the 50th Anniversary Symposium, Cincinnati, 18–20 April 1997 (1998), edited with Diane Harris-Cline (out of print, but available for free download)
 Amenhotep III: Perspectives on His Reign (1998), edited with David B. O'Connor, 
 The Battles of Armageddon: Megiddo and the Jezreel Valley from the Bronze Age to the Nuclear Age (2000),  (Winner, 2001 Biblical Archaeology Society "Best Popular Book on Archaeology")
 Jerusalem Besieged: From Ancient Canaan to Modern Israel (2004), 
 The Ancient Egyptian World (2005), written with Jill Rubalcaba, 
 Thutmose III: A New Biography (2006), edited with David B. O'Connor, .
 From Eden to Exile: Unraveling Mysteries of the Bible (2007),  (Winner, 2009 Biblical Archaeology Society "Best Popular Book on Archaeology")
 Biblical Archaeology: A Very Short Introduction (2009),  (Winner, 2011 Biblical Archaeology Society "Best Popular Book on Archaeology")
 The Oxford Handbook of the Bronze Age Aegean (2010), 
 Digging for Troy: From Homer to Hisarlik (2011), written with Jill Rubalcaba, 
 Ancient Empires: Formation and Resistance in the Near Eastern, Greco-Roman, and Early Muslim Worlds (2011), written with Mark W. Graham, 
 The Ahhiyawa Texts (2011), written with Gary Beckman and Trevor Bryce, 
 Ramesses III: The Life and Times of Egypt’s Last Hero (2012), edited with David B. O'Connor, 
 The Trojan War: A Very Short Introduction (2013), 
 Three Stones Make a Wall: The Story of Archaeology (2017),  (Winner, 2018 ASOR “Nancy Lapp Best Popular Book” Award)
 The Social Archaeology of the Levant: From Prehistory to the Present (2019), co-edited with Assaf Yasur-Landu and Yorke Rowan,  (Winner, 2019 ASOR “G. Ernest Wright” Award)
 Digging Up Armageddon: The Search for the Lost City of Solomon (2020), 
 Digging Deeper: How Archaeology Works  (2020), 
 1177 B.C.: The Year Civilization Collapsed, revised and updated edition (2021), ; first edition (2014), (Winner, 2014 ASOR "Nancy Lapp Best Popular Book" Award)

Selected television appearances
Cline has appeared in numerous television documentaries for ABC News, the National Geographic Channel, the Discovery Channel, the BBC, PBS, and the History Channel.
 Back to the Beginning with Christiane Amanpour (ABC News): Garden of Eden, Biblical Noah's Ark Replica Sails in the Netherlands, Searching for Noah's Ark, Joshua and Conquest of Canaan, David, the Bible's First Real Hero, Search for the Ark of the Covenant
 King Solomon's Mines (National Geographic Channel)
 Biblical Plagues (National Geographic Channel)
 Jerusalem: Center of the World (PBS)
 Countdown to Armageddon (History Channel)
 Mysteries/Science of the Bible (National Geographic Channel): Ark of the Covenant, Exodus Revealed, Lost Cities, Secrets of Revelation, Noah's Ark, and Lost Kings of the Bible (David and Solomon)
 Secrets of the Aegean Apocalypse (Mystery of the Sea Peoples) (History Channel)
 Is It Real: Atlantis (National Geographic Channel)
 The Truth of Troy (BBC)
 Joshua and the Battle of Jericho (Discovery Channel)
 Time Titans (Pilot Episode, did not air) (History Channel)

References

External links
 Cline's website at The George Washington University
 Cline's own public website
 Cline's page at Academia.edu, with links to many of his uploaded articles
 The GWU Capitol Archaeological Institute website
 Tel Kabri 2019 project website
 The Megiddo Expedition website at Tel Aviv University
 Press release from Haifa University on Minoan painted plaster found at Tel Kabri, Israel
 1177 B.C.: The year civilization collapsed lecture published October 11, 2016

American anthropologists
American archaeologists
American male non-fiction writers
21st-century American historians
21st-century American male writers
Historians of antiquity
Living people
1960 births
George Washington University faculty
Dartmouth College alumni
University of Pennsylvania alumni
Yale Graduate School of Arts and Sciences alumni
American Egyptologists
Historians of Jews and Judaism
American expatriates in Greece